Vasily Pavlovich Smirnov (18 December 1908 in Serpukhov–12 June 1987 in Serpukhov) was a Soviet footballer. From 1927-1930 he played for FC Moscow Presnya and from 1931-1939 he played for Dinamo Moscow, making 39 appearances and scoring 27 goals. He played 11 unofficial international matches for the USSR, with 4 goals. Later he coached FC Zvezda Serpukhov from 1957 to 1968.

References

1908 births
People from Serpukhov
1987 deaths
Soviet Top League players
FC Dynamo Moscow players
Soviet football managers
Soviet footballers
Association footballers not categorized by position
Sportspeople from Moscow Oblast